Stavro Skëndi (born 1905 in Korçë; d. August 17, 1989 in Long Island) was an Albanian American linguist and historian.

Career 

Skendi studied at Robert College in Istanbul, graduating in 1928. He continued his studies at the University of Geneva and returned to Albania, where he taught in Commerce schools. In 1946, he emigrated to the U.S. He enrolled at Columbia University as a Ph.D. candidate, graduating in 1951. He joined the faculty as a lecturer in a program on East-Central Europe, specializing in Balkan language studies. He succeeded Nelo Drizari as lecturer and taught courses in Albanian and South Slavic at Columbia from 1954 until his retirement in 1972. Throughout this period, he cultivated his interest in Albanian studies, writing and publishing frequently.

Skendi was a Guggenheim Fellow and a visiting fellow at the Institute for Advanced Study in Princeton, New Jersey.

Selected works 

 Gjendja e Shqiperise sot dhe detyra e Shqiptarvet. (The situation of Albania today and the duty of the Albanians.) Konference e dhene ne Detroit, me 19 prill, 1953. Detroit 1953.
 Albanian political thought and revolutionary activity, 1881–1912. München 1954.
 Albanian and South Slavic oral epic poetry. American Folklore Society, Philadelphia 1954.
 The Political Evolution of Albania, 1912-1944. Mid-European Studies Center, New York 1954.
 Albania. (With Mehmet Beqiraj, George Bossy, Robert F. Byrnes.) Atlantic Pr., London 1957.
 Mendimi politik dhe veprimtarija kryengritese shqiptare, 1881–1912. (Political opinion and the activities of the Albanian uprising, 1881–1912) New York 1958.
 The history of the Albanian alphabet: a case of complex cultural and political development. R. Oldenbourg, München 1960.
 The emergence of the modern Balkan literary languages: a comparative approach. Otto Harrassowitz, Wiesbaden 1964.
 Crypto-Christianity in the Balkan area under the Ottomans. American Association for the Advancement of Slavic Studies, 1967.
 The Albanian national awakening, 1878-1912. Princeton University Press, Princeton, N.J. 1967.
 Kačić's "Razgovor" and Fishta's "Lahuta e Malcís". Wiesbaden 1968.
 Language as a factor of national identity in the Balkans of the nineteenth century. American Philosophical Society, Philadelphia 1975.
 Balkan cultural studies. East European Monographs, Boulder, [Colo.]; distributed by Columbia University Press, New York 1980.
 Zgjimi kombëtar shqiptar: 1878-1912. (The awakening of the Albanian nation: 1878-1912.) Tirana/Phoenix 2000.

References 

20th-century Albanian historians
20th-century American historians
American male non-fiction writers
Albanian emigrants to the United States
Albanologists
1905 births
1989 deaths
Robert College alumni
University of Geneva alumni
Columbia University alumni
Columbia University faculty
Institute for Advanced Study visiting scholars
Albanian schoolteachers
Balli Kombëtar
People from Korçë
People from Manastir vilayet
Eastern Orthodox Christians from Albania
20th-century American male writers